Avengers: Infinity War is a 2018 American superhero film.

Infinity War may also refer to:
The Infinity War, a 1992 comic book storyline
Infinity Wars, a 2018 comic book storyline
Infinity War (event), the fictional war depicted in the film